Señora is the Spanish-language equivalent of Ms. or Mrs.

Señora (TV series), 1988 Venezuelan telenovela
Señora, 1979 album by Rocío Jurado
"Señora", 1992 song by Tito Rojas
"Señora", 1997 song by Francisco Céspedes from Vida Loca
"Señora", 2011 song by Vena